The Safed subdistrict is one of Israel's sub-districts in Northern District. The subdistrict is composed of mostly the historical Mandatory Safed Subdistrict.

References